Elu is an Austronesian language spoken on the northern coast of Manus Island, New Guinea.

References

Manus languages
Languages of Manus Province